Choraginae is a subfamily of fungus weevils in the beetle family Anthribidae. There are about 9 genera and more than 180 described species in Choraginae.

Genera
These nine genera belong to the subfamily Choraginae:
 Acaromimus Jordan, 1907
 Araecerus Schoenherr, 1823
 Choragus Kirby, 1819
 Euxenulus Valentine, 1960
 Euxenus LeConte, 1876
 Habroxenus Valentine, 1998
 Neoxenus Valentine, 1998
 Pseudochoragus Petri, 1912
 Sicanthus Valentine, 1998

References

Further reading

External links

 

Anthribidae
Articles created by Qbugbot